Leptocera is a genus of flies belonging to the family Lesser Dung flies.

Species

L. aequilimbata Duda, 1925
L. alpina Roháček, 1982
L. atra (Vanschuytbroeck, 1951)
L. basilewskyi (Vanschuytbroeck, 1962)
L. boruvkai Roháček, 1993
L. caenosa (Rondani, 1880)
L. chambii (Vanschuytbroeck, 1950)
L. cultellipennis (Enderlein, 1938)
L. decisetosa (Vanschuytbroeck, 1950)
L. dicrofulva Buck, 2009
L. duplicata Richards, 1955
L. dyscola Roháček & Papp, 1983
L. elgonensis Richards, 1938
L. ellipsipennis Richards, 1955
L. equispina Papp, 1973
L. erratica Buck, 2009
L. erythrocera (Becker, 1920)
L. finalis (Collin, 1956)
L. fontinalis (Fallén, 1826)
L. fulva (Malloch, 1912)
L. gongylotheca Buck, 2009
L. hexadike Buck, 2009
L. insularum Buck, 2009
L. kanata Buck, 2009
L. koningsbergeri Duda, 1925
L. kovacsi Duda, 1925
L. longilimbata Buck, 2009
L. marginata (Adams, 1905)
L. melanaspis (Bezzi, 1908)
L. mendozana Richards, 1931
L. neocurvinervis Richards, 1931
L. neofinalis  Buck, 2009
L. neovomerata Buck, 2009
L. nigra Olivier, 1813
L. nigrolimbata Duda, 1925
L. oldenbergi (Duda, 1918)
L. papallacta Buck, 2009
L. parafinalis Papp, 1973
L. parallelipennis Buck, 2009
L. paranigrolimbata Duda, 1925
L. plax Buck, 2009
L. posteronitens Buck, 2009
L. prolixofulva Buck, 2009
L. rhadinofulva Buck, 2009
L. salatigae (de Meijere, 1914)
L. schlingeri Richards, 1963
L. sphaerotheca Buck, 2009
L. spinitarsata Papp, 1973
L. stenodiscoidalis Papp, 1991
L. sterniloba Roháček, 1983
L. tapanti Buck, 2009
L. tenuispina Buck, 2009
L. vomerata Roháček & Papp, 1983

References

Sphaeroceridae
Diptera of Africa
Diptera of Asia
Diptera of South America
Diptera of North America
Muscomorph flies of Europe
Sphaeroceroidea genera